Alan Zelenetz is an American film producer and comic-book writer best known for co-creating the series Alien Legion for the Marvel Comics imprint Epic Comics and a founder of Ovie Entertainment. Zelenetz also wrote several issues of Marvel's Moon Knight series, several issues of Thor and a run of Conan the King (issues #16–28).

Biography 

Before becoming a film producer, he was a junior high school principal at the Yeshiva of Flatbush, an Orthodox Jewish school in Brooklyn, and Solomon Schechter High School of New York. One of the science teachers under his supervision was the father of Darren Aronofsky, director of Pi (1998) and Requiem for a Dream (2000).

Alan Zelenetz quit his job as a high school principal and worked his way through a position at Marvel. He did some volunteer proofreading work for a while, and then started to write for Thor, Conan the Barbarian, and Moon Knight. For Moon Knight, he introduced the Jewish identity of the character in the storyline. In 1982, in Thor Annual #10, Zelenetz introduced the first Nigerian hero, Shango (recruited by Thor to confront Demogorge), in the history of Marvel.

While working for Marvel Comics, Zelenetz was the main author and researcher for The Official Handbook of the Conan Universe, a guide to the Hyborian Age, the fictional setting of the Conan the Barbarian stories.

He is also director of ICI, the Institute for Curricular Initiatives in New York City.

Selected filmography 
 Pi (1998) (Judaica advisor)
 Darkon (2006) (producer, executive producer;)
 The Funeral Party (2007) (co-producer)
 Andorra scheduled in (2007) (producer)

Selected comics bibliography
Alien Legion (1984) 1-20
Alien Legion (1987) 1
Amazing High Adventure 4
The Avengers vol.1 224
Bizarre Adventures 32
Conan The Barbarian 145
Conan The King 20-27
Epic Illustrated 30
Official Handbook of the Conan Universe
King Conan 16-19
Kull the Conqueror 1-10
Kull the Vale of Shadow OGN
Marvel Age Annual 1
Marvel Fanfare vol 1 13, 34-37
Marvel Graphic Novel 15, 25
Master of Kung Fu vol 1 123-125
Moon Knight vol 1 18, 21–22, 27, 32, 36-38
Moon Knight vol 2 1-4
The Savage Sword of Conan 83. 86. 88. 95
Thor vol 1 329–336, Annual 10-13
What If? vol 1 35, 39, 41

References

External links
 
 Ovie Entertainment
 Works in Marvel Comics (as a writer)

American film producers
Living people
American comics writers
Year of birth missing (living people)